Floriano Vieira Peixoto ( 30 April 1839 – 29 June 1895), born in Ipioca (today a district of the city of Maceió in the State of Alagoas), nicknamed the "Iron Marshal", was a Brazilian soldier and politician, a veteran of the Paraguayan War, and the second president of Brazil. He was the first vice president of Brazil to have succeeded the president mid-term.

Election

Peixoto was an army marshal when elected vice-president in February 1891. In November 1891, he rose to the presidency after the resignation of Marshal Deodoro da Fonseca, the first president of Brazil. Peixoto came to the presidency in a difficult period of the new Brazilian Republic, which was in the midst of a general political and economic crisis made worse by the effects of the bursting of the Encilhamento economic bubble. As Vice President, he had also served as the President of the Senate.

Presidency
His government was marked by several revolutions. Peixoto defeated a naval officers' rebellion against him in 1893–1894 and the Federalist Revolution in the States of Rio Grande do Sul and Santa Catarina, with use of strength during the same year - to maintain territorial integrity.

 His government was marked by an increased centralization of power and nationalism, with the florianista cult of personality being the first phenomenon of a favorable political expression towards a republican politician in Brazil.

Legacy
He is often referred to as "the Consolidator of the Republic" or "The Iron Marshal." He left the presidency on 15 November 1894. In spite of his unpopularity, he was responsible for the consolidation of the First Brazilian Republic.

Desterro, the capital of the state of Santa Catarina, was renamed Florianópolis after its defeat by loyalist troops at the end of the Federalist Revolution.

References

External links

 

1839 births
1895 deaths
People from Maceió
Presidents of Brazil
Vice presidents of Brazil
Government ministers of Brazil
Presidents of the Federal Senate (Brazil)
Marshals of Brazil
Brazilian Freemasons
19th-century Brazilian people
Liberal Party (Brazil) politicians
Candidates for President of Brazil
Brazilian military personnel of the Paraguayan War
Candidates for Vice President of Brazil